Crèche or  creche (from Latin cripia "crib, cradle") may refer to:
Child care center, an organization of adults who take care of children in place of their parents
Nativity scene, a group of figures arranged to represent the birth of Jesus Christ
Preschool or nursery school
Crèche (zoology), animals taking care of young that are not their own